Robert Brooks (1790 – 5 June 1882) was a British Conservative Party politician, businessman and trader.

Family
Born in Laceby, Lincolnshire—and baptised there at St Mary's Church on 5 April 1791—Brooks was the son of yeoman farmer William Brooks and Ann Ostler. In 1833, he married Hannah, daughter of wine merchant Joshua Penny, and they had five sons—including Robert Alexander, Henry and Herbert—and three daughters.

Shipping business
Brooks was first apprenticed to Hull timber merchant and shipowner John Barkworth, under whom he travelled as supercargo to Mauritius in 1814, and India between 1818 and 1819, both times Barkworth's Elizabeth. Between the 1830s and 1870s, he became one of the leaders of trade between Britain and Australia, with some connection found between his own career—involving exporting, importing, shipping, finance, banking, and political lobbying including promoting assisted emigration—and the development of the colonial Australian economy.

In 1820, he established his own London-based firm and, in 1823, he made his first and only trade voyage to Australia, travelling aboard the Elizabeth, now his ship, to Hobart and Sydney. During the 1830s, he established business connections in eastern Australia and New Zealand, including Robert Campbell junior, John Rickards, and Raine and Ramsay, and became one of the largest importers of Australian wool. In this trade, he became chairman of the New South Wales and Van Diemen's Land Commercial Association, a London wool auction regulator, in 1846.

Throughout his working closely with trusted colleagues Ranulph Dacre from 1830 to 1843, Robert Towns from 1843 to 1847, and Charles Dickens' illustrator Octavius Browne from 1847 to 1855.

During his commercial ventures, he built a 12-ship fleet, including a number of whaling vessels, reaching over 5,000 tons but, in the 1850s, his interest in shipping diminished, and new investments in ships were only in those directed by business associates. Instead, he focused on financing the wool trade and other Australian ventures including gold mining.

In 1841, Brooks opened a small office in St Peter's Chambers, near Cornhill in the City of London, in 1855, he entered into partnership with Robert Spence, with the firm becoming known as Robert Brooks & Co. Three of Brooks' sons became partners of the firm in the 1860s, before Brooks then retired in 1872. The firm existed long after his death, holding as one of the largest importers of wool to the UK, and remained in family hands, diversifying into management and ownership of tea plantations in Ceylon, until 1968 when it entered liquidation.

Corporate activities
Outside of his own business, between 1837 and 1876 Brooks was a founding director of the Union Bank of Australia, a forerunner of the Australia and New Zealand Banking Group, where he was a proponent of private merchants. He was also a director of the London Dock Company, the Southern Whale Fishery Company, and the Great Eastern Steam Navigation Company. He was also a director of a number of insurance and mining companies, and other abortive steamshipping ventures, and actively worked to maintain synergistic relationships between Australian trade companies and colleagues in the City of London.

Political career
In 1859, Brooks was persuaded by Conservative colleagues to stand for election in Weymouth and Melcombe Regis, who cited his maritime aura as a positive factor. He then won the seat, holding it as a backbencher until 1868 when he did not seek re-election.

References

External links
 

UK MPs 1859–1865
UK MPs 1865–1868
1790 births
1882 deaths
Australian people in whaling
British people in whaling
Conservative Party (UK) MPs for English constituencies